Events in the year 1845 in Brazil.

Incumbents
 Monarch – Pedro II

Events
March 1 - Ragamuffin War: peace negotiations led by Luis Alves de Lima e Silva and Antônio Vicente da Fontoura concluded with the signing of the Ponche Verde Treaty between rebels and imperial government, in Dom Pedrito. The treaty offered the rebels a full amnesty, full incorporation into the imperial army and the choice of the next provincial president. All the debts of the Riograndense Republic were paid off by the Empire of Brazil and a tariff of 25% was introduced on imported charque. The Treaty did not state clearly whether the Riograndense and Juliana republics remained independent, but they remained in the Empire of Brazil

Births
 26 January - Júlio César de Noronha
Prince Luigi, Count of Roccaguglielma, son of Princess Januária of Brazil

Deaths

 
1840s in Brazil
Years of the 19th century in Brazil
Brazil
Brazil